The Bugun is a river in Baydibek and Otyrar districts, Turkistan Region, southern Kazakhstan.

The waters are used for irrigation.

Course
The river begins at the confluence of the rivers Ulken-Bugun and Bala Bugun, flowing from the southwestern slopes of the Karatau ridge. In its last stretch it bends northwards and discharges into lake Kum-Kol, not reaching the Syr Darya channel. The river is fed mainly by snow and groundwater.

References

Rivers of Kazakhstan